In economics, capital services refer to a chain-type index of service flows derived from the stock of physical assets and software. These assets are coordination, equipment, software, structures, land, and inventories. Capital services are estimated as a capital-income weighted average of the growth rates of each asset. Capital services differ from capital stocks because short-lived assets such as equipment and software provide more services per unit of stock than long-lived assets such as land. Unlike capital goods, capital services are owned by the person or group of people providing them.

See also
 Bureau of Labor Statistics
 Capital goods
 Capital stocks
 Progressive theory of capital

References

External links
 Capital services in glossary, U.S. Bureau of Labor Statistics Division of Information Services
 Capital Goods and Services, University of North Carolina 
 Walras's Progressive Theory of Capital

Capital (economics)